Scan-Line Interleave (SLI) from 3dfx is a method for linking two (or more) video cards or chips together to produce a single output. It is an application of parallel processing for computer graphics, meant to increase the processing power available for graphics.  SLI from 3dfx was introduced in 1998 and used in the Voodoo2 line of graphics accelerators. However, the original Voodoo Graphics card and the VSA-100 were also SLI-capable.

Nvidia Corporation reintroduced the SLI acronym in 2004 (though it now stands for Scalable Link Interface). NVIDIA's SLI, compared to 3dfx's SLI, is modernized to use graphics cards interfaced over the PCI Express bus.

Function

3dfx's SLI design was the first attempt, in the consumer PC market, at combining the rendering power of two video cards. The two 3dfx cards were connected by a small ribbon cable inside the PC. This cable shared graphics and synchronization information between the cards. Each 3dfx card rendered alternating horizontal lines of pixels composing a frame.

See also
 Scalable Link Interface - Nvidia
 AMD CrossFireX - AMD

References

External links
 The 3dfx Help Page

3dfx Interactive
Graphics cards

ar:واجهة توصيل قابلة للتوسع
bs:SLI
cs:Scalable Link Interface
es:Scalable Link Interface
fr:Scalable Link Interface
ko:스케일러블 링크 인터페이스
it:Scalable Link Interface
nl:Scalable Link Interface
ja:Scalable Link Interface
no:SLI
pl:SLI
pt:Scalable Link Interface
ru:NVIDIA SLI
sr:SLI
fi:Scalable Link Interface
sv:Scalable Link Interface
tr:SLI
zh:SLI